KMST may refer to:

 KMST (FM), a radio station (88.5 FM) licensed to Rolla, Missouri, United States
 KMST (Monterey), a local educational cable channel in Monterey, California, United States
 KION-TV, a television station (channel 46 analog/32 digital) licensed to Monterey, California, United States, which held the call sign KMST until October 1993
 Korean Maritime Safety Tribunal